The Southwest Florida Eagle Cam is a website featuring live streaming webcams trained on a bald eagle nest, which sits 60 feet above the ground, in a Slash Pine tree in North Fort Myers, Florida. The live streaming website shows the parent eagles and their family as they build and restore the nest, mate, lay eggs, and challenge the natural elements and predators in the area.  
The site launched with one camera in September 2012.  It is one of more than a dozen eagle webcams across America. 

The live webcam was set up by the landowner's company, Dick Pritchett Real Estate, to observe the eagles in their natural habitat in hopes of providing an educational and learning experience.

About the Nest
This nest is labeled LE026-B of the Florida State Monitoring Program. It has been monitored for 6 years. The first year was when the nest was across the street in 2007. The pair relocated the nest in 2006-2007 to its present location.

A typical nest is around 5 feet in diameter. Eagles often use the same nest year after year. Over the years, some nests become enormous, as much as 9 feet in diameter, weighing two tons. The Southwest Florida Eagle Cam nest is approximately  8 feet in diameter and a short one mile flight away from the Caloosahatchee River, which serves as their primary food source.  The pair of eagles rely mostly on fish from the river (Mullet, Catfish, Red Fish, Snook, Gar), but may also eat small rodents if the opportunity presents itself.

According to the Florida Fish and Wildlife Service, which tracks Bald Eagle nests, M15 and Harriet have 133 neighbors in a 25-mile radius.  Their closest neighbor is 1 mile away.

About the Cameras
To preserve the natural habitat of the eagles, the camera is positioned six feet above the nest and is attached to a tree limb, using no screws or nails. The noiseless camera also uses night vision.  This feature allows the camera to see at night without disturbing the eagles.

For season 2, Dick Pritchett Real Estate installed two cameras, hoping to enhance the viewing experience.

Harriet and Ozzie and Ozzie's death  
Harriet and Ozzie received their names by the landowners and area birdwatchers who fell in love with the duo from a distance. Their names are based on an American sitcom, The Adventures of Ozzie and Harriet.

On March 17, 2015, Ozzie was found by Florida Fish and Wildlife Conservation Commission (FWC) officials and taken to the Clinic for Rehabilitation of Wildlife, Inc. (CROW) for evaluation after showing signs of disorientation and injury. After 97 days of care to recover from a broken left clavicle and a broken left coracoid bone, Ozzie was released back into the wild near the nest.  On Saturday, September 19, Ozzie made an appearance at the nest. On September 27, after seen fighting with a male eagle in the area, Ozzie was found injured and again admitted back into CROW's care. On Tuesday, September 29, Ozzie died.

Nesting Season History 
The U. S. Fish and Wildlife Service estimates that there are at least 9,789 nesting pairs of bald eagles in the contiguous United States. While the largest concentration of bald eagles is in Alaska, bald eagles can be found in every state except Hawaii with Florida, Wisconsin, Washington, Minnesota, Oregon, and Michigan all having a prevalent bald eagle population. 
The 2012-2013 (October 2012-May 2013) marked the first year the nest was streamed live to the world. Over 18 million viewers tuned in to watch the adult eagles, Harriet and Ozzie, raise their 2 eaglets (Hope and Honor) from birth to fledge.

• The 1st egg (E1/Hope) was laid on November 26 at 1:47 pm., hatched January 1, 2013 at 10:44 p.m. and fledged the nest on March 25 at 7:51 a.m. 
• The 2nd egg (E2/Honor) was laid on November 29 at 6:38 pm., hatched January 3, 2013 at 9:49.p.m. and fledged the nest on March 25 at 8:23 a.m.

While cameras were not set up to watch the activity prior to 2012, the below activity has been documented about the past nesting seasons:

2006-2007:  Two eaglets fledged.

2007-2008:  Fledglings not confirmed.

2008-2009:  Two eaglets.

2009-2010:  One eaglet.

2010-2011:  One fledgling confirmed.

2011-2012:  One fledgling confirmed

2012/2013 Season

The 2012-2013 season marked the first year the nest was streamed live to the world. Over 16 million viewers tuned in to watch Adult Eagles Harriet and Ozzie raise their 2 eaglets from birth to fledge.

Hope/E1
 Egg Laid: November 26, 2012 1:47 PM EST
 Hatched: January 1, 2013 at 10:44 PM EST (day 36)
 Fledged: March 25, 2013 at 7:51 AM EST (day 83)
Honor/E2
 Egg Laid: November 29, 2012 6:38 PM EST
 Hatched: January 3, 2013 at 9:49 PM EST (day 35)
 Fledged: March 25, 2013 at 8:23 AM EST (day 81)

2013/2014 Season

The 2013-2014 season brought many challenges to both the viewers and the eagles. Ozzie & Harriet returned to the nest in October and laid two eggs in November.

E3
 Egg Laid: November 17, 2013 4:37 PM EST
 Hatched: December 23, 2013 at 11:46 PM EST (day 36)
 E3 passed away February 2, 2014 at 4:53 AM at 41 days old due to unknown causes.
E4 (day 41)
 Egg Laid: November 20, 2013 6:18 PM EST
 Hatched: December 25, 2013 at 10:21 AM EST (day 35)
 Fledged: April 4, 2014 at 8:27 AM EST (day 100)

2014/2015 Season

The 2014-2015 season marked the third year the nest was streamed live to the world, this time with two high definition cameras. Ozzie and Harriet returned to the nest in October and laid two eggs in November.

E5
 Egg Laid: November 19, 2014
 Hatched: December 26, 2014 (day 37)
 E5 passed away January 20, 2015 at 10:15 PM due to unknown causes.  (day 25)
E6
 Egg Laid: November 22, 2014
 Hatched: December 27, 2014 (day 35)
 Fledged: March 23, 2015 (day 86)
 Last Seen: May 4, 2015 (day 128)

On March 17, 2015, Ozzie was found by Florida Fish and Wildlife Conservation Commission (FWC) officials and taken to the Clinic for Rehabilitation of Wildlife, Inc. (CROW) for evaluation after showing signs of disorientation and injury. After 97 days of care to recover from a broken left clavicle and a broken left coracoid bone, Ozzie was released back into the wild near the nest. On Saturday, September 19th, Ozzie made an appearance at the nest. On September 27th, after seen fighting with a male eagle in the area, Ozzie was found injured and again admitted back into CROW’s care. On Tuesday, September 29th, Ozzie passed away.

2015/2016 Season

The 2015-2016 season was a season of many firsts for Harriet & her new mate M15 (short for Male 2015). After Ozzie’s passing, Harriet spent a few weeks courting possible new mates but eventually bonded (or mated) with M15, laying two eggs.

E7
 Egg Laid: December 19, 2015 at 4:25 PM
 Hatched: January 26, 2016 at 7:23 AM  (day 38)
 Fledged: April 16th, 2016  (day 81)
E8
 Egg Laid: December 22, 2015 at 5:40 PM
 Hatched: January 27, 2016 at 10:39 PM  (day 36)
 Fledged: May 3rd, 2016  (day 97)
 Last Seen: August 18, 2016  (day 194)

On Feb. 9, 2015, E8 had to be cut free from the nest after getting monofilament fishing line wrapped around its leg and foot cutting off circulation and causing swelling. E8 was taken to the CROW clinic for treatment and released back to the nest 3 days later. The young eaglets continued to thrive and develop into juvenile eagles, fledging the nest on April 16th (E7) and May 3th (E8).

But, as the nest started to deteriorate, the eagles were attacked by an owl on May 7. E7 returned the next day, E8 did not and was feared dead. On May 13th, nearly a week after the attack, volunteers found E8 alive in a nearby neighborhood with a broken leg. E8 was admitted to CROW for a second time for rehabilitation and recovery. After nearly 3 months at CROW, E8 was released back into the wild on August 18th.

2016 – 2017 Season marked the second season Harriet and her new mate M15 mated as a pair. The season started with much anticipation if the eagles would return as the nest had been completely lost after the end of the last season. Luckily, Harriet & M returned to the area and got to work in September and the nest was in great shape for the laying of their two eggs in November. (Egg #1 – November 22, 5:03PM/ Egg# 2 – November 25th, 6:13PM). Unfortunately Egg #1 was not viable and did not hatch. Egg #2/E9 hatched December 31st at 7:33AM. Being the only eaglet in the nest, E9 thrived and grew on schedule, even setting a record for the earliest fledge when accidentally fledging on March 14th at 7:22 (age 73 days). Making a triumphant return to the nest after its accidental fledge, E9 learned all the fundamentals of survival from Harriet & M and was last seen in the nest area on May 2.   

2017/2018 Season

The 2017-2018 season was the third year as a mated pair for Harriet and M15. Both Eagles returned to the area in mid-August, working together to build up the nest before eggs were laid.

E10
 Egg Laid: November 19, 2017
 Hatched: December 26, 2017 (day 37)
 Fledged: March 14, 2018 (day 68)
 Last Seen: May 2018
E11
 Egg Laid: November 22, 2017
 Hatched: December 27, 2017 (day 35)
 Fledged: March 16, 2018 (day 79)
 Last Seen: May 2018

E10 and E11 hatched just 19 hours apart. With just hours and not days between hatching, the siblings had a close bond and developed at a similar pace. Never far apart; they spent hours learning to hunt, fight and survive in the wild.

2018/2019 Season

The 2018-2019 Season was the fourth year as a mated pair for Harriet and M15 and the seventh year streaming this nest live. Both Eagles returned to the area in mid-August, working together to build up the nest before eggs were laid. Similar to the previous season, the siblings had a close bond and developed at a similar pace. Never far apart; they spent hours learning to hunt, fight and survive in the wild.

E12
 Egg Laid: November 16, 2018
 Hatched: December 23, 2018 (day 37)
 Fledged: March 12, 2019 (day 79)
 Last Seen: April 2019
E13
 Egg Laid: November 19, 2018
 Hatched: December 24, 2018 (day 35
 Fledged: March 14, 2019 (day 70)
 Last Seen: May 2019

2019/2020 Season

Although 2019-2020 was the fifth year as a mated pair for Harriet & M15, it was a season of many firsts for our dynamic duo. We saw death, resilience and new life along with many new milestone records hit by E15 & E16.

E14
 Egg Laid: November 12, 2019
 Hatched: December 19, 2019 (day 37)
 E14 passed away on January 15, 2020 (day 27)
Egg #2
 Egg Laid: November 16, 2019
E15
 Egg Laid: February 22, 2020
 Hatched: March 31, 2020 (day 38)
 Fledged: June 15, 2020 (day 76)
 Last Seen: October 18, 2020 (day 201)
E16
 Egg Laid: February 25, 2020
 Hatched: April 2, 2020 (day 37)
 Fledged: July 1, 2020 (day 90)
 Last Seen: August 8, 2020 (day 128)

E14 passed away on January 15, 2020 (Cause of death: loss of blood caused by broken blood feather). The liver tissue of E14 was found to contain markedly increased levels of brodifacoum, a type of anticoagulant rodenticide or rat poison. Anticoagulant rodenticides, or rat poisons, prevent the blood from clotting normally and cause an animal that has ingested a toxic amount to bleed to death)

The second 2019/20 egg was laid November 16, 2019 at 18:30:43pm, but never hatched. It was removed from the nest on January 15 when CROW removed the remains of E14. CROW determined that the egg had been fertilized, but the embryo stopped developing.

2020/2021 Season 

On January 29, 2021 (approximately 1:30pm): E17 and E18 were removed from the nest by CROW when concern for the eaglet’s health was noticed (eyes swollen and crusty). E17 and E18 were re-nested by CROW on February 5, 2021 at 9:41:00am. Harriet returned to the nest at 2:38pm and M15 returned at 4:02pm. Food was brought to the nest February 6, 2021 at 8:41am. From CROW: MARCH 16, 2021: E17 & E18 EYE SWAB RESULTS: Swabs of the Southwest Florida Eagle Cam eaglets infected eyes came back positive for Avian chlamydiosis. Avian chlamydiosis is a bacterial disease caused by Chlamydophila psittaci (C. psittaci), which is carried commonly by birds. This finding is consistent with our cytology results which allowed our treatment to be effective. Thanks to the incredible work by our team of veterinarians, technicians and wildlife rehabilitators, the eaglets were returned to their nest healthy and have continued to grow and thrive!

E17

 Egg Laid: December 16, 2020 at 4:58pm

Hatched: January 23, 2021 at 4:41pm (day 38)
Branched: March 26, 2021 at 8:42am (day 62)
Fledged: April 14, 2021 at 1:42pm (day 81)
Last seen: May 23, 2021 at 8:28pm (day 120)
E18
Egg Laid: December 19, 2020 at 4:45pm
Hatched January 23, 2021 at 6:26pm (day 35)
Branched: March 27, 2021 at 10:13am (day 63)
Fledged: April 21, 2021 at 8:52am (day 88)
Last seen: May 24, 2021 at 9:45am (day 121)

2021/2022 Season

E19

 Egg laid: November 20, 2021

Hatched: December 27, 2021 (day 37)
Branched: March 4, 2022 (day 67)
Fledged: March 20, 2022 (day 83)
Last seen: April 28, 2022 at 10:18am (day 122)
E20
Egg laid: November 23, 2021
Hatched: December 28, 2021 (day 35)
Branched: March 6, 2022 (day 68)
Fledged:  March 22, 2022 (day 84)
Last seen: May 18, 2022 (day 141)

2022/2023 Season

On September 28, 2022, a category 4 hurricane, Hurricane Ian, destroyed the nest. Harriet and M15 left the nest prior to the storm's arrival and upon returning, quickly rebuilt the nest. Two eggs were laid, Egg 1 on November 29, 2022, and Egg 2 on December 2, 2022.  On February 2, 2023, the beloved eagle matriarch, Harriet, was seen heading ENE and had been vocalizing at intruders in the area.  She did not return to the nest.

E21

 Egg laid: November 29, 2022 at 6:09pm
 Hatched: January 4, 2023 at 8:22pm (day 36)
 Branched: March 17, 2023 at 11:45am (day 72)
 Fledged:
 Last seen: 

E22

 Egg laid: December 2, 2022 at 8:09pm
 Hatched: January 7, 2023 at 4:43am (day 36)
 Branched: 
 Fledged:
 Last seen:

How to Tell Male and Female Apart
While it is a bit difficult to tell the adult eagles apart, The Southwest Florida Eagle Cam moderators provide the below identifying features:

(Female)  Harriet
Much larger 
Inverted V in front neck ruffles
Dark circles around eyes
Thick/larger beak, larger gape
Black speckles high on tail
Dark heart shape on head, back right
Has a Longer middle talon than O

(Male) Now M15 for Male 2015 (about 5 or 6 years old)
Smaller 
Ridge over eye has more feather cover.  
His eyes appear darker in color than the female.
There is a small dark spot on the right side of his face.

Funding & The Southwest Florida Eagle Cam Foundation
The launch of the Southwest Florida Eagle Cam was funded and continues to be majorly supported by the private funds and public donations.

The Pritchett Family started the Southwest Florida Eagle Cam Foundation in the Spring of 2013 so viewers and philanthropists could donate to a fund to help maintain the camera for future season of living streaming.   
The goal of these cameras is to foster appreciation, admiration and respect for these magnificent creatures through the ability to bring these beautiful birds into your homes. The intentions of the Pritchett Family are to learn from these birds so we may better understand them and their habits.

References

External links
 The Southwest Florida Eagle Cam
 Dick Pritchett Real Estate
 Florida State Monitoring Program

Birdwatching sites in the United States
Ornithological equipment and methods